This page lists the armoury (emblazons=graphics and blazons=heraldic descriptions; or coats of arms) of the communes in  Seine-Maritime.

A

B

C

D

E

F

G

H

I

J

L

M

N

O

P

Q

R

S

T

V

Y

References

External links 

Seine-Maritime
Seine-Maritime